Linda Emery Lee Cadwell (born March 21, 1945) is a retired American teacher and writer. She is the author of the Bruce Lee biography Bruce Lee: The Man Only I Knew, upon which the film Dragon: The Bruce Lee Story is based, as well as the founder, a former trustee of, and an unpaid advisor of the Bruce Lee Foundation. Lee Cadwell is the widow of martial arts master and actor Bruce Lee (19401973) and the mother of actor Brandon Lee (19651993) and actress Shannon Lee (born 1969).

Life and career
She was born in Everett, Washington, the daughter of Vivian R. (née Hester) (1911-1998) and Everett Emery. Her family was Baptist and of Swedish, Irish, and English descent.

She met Bruce Lee while she was attending Garfield High School, where Bruce came to give a kung fu demonstration; he was attending the University of Washington at the time. Eventually, she became one of his kung fu students when she was attending the University of Washington, studying to become a teacher.

They married on August 17, 1964. Linda was a few credits short from graduation. They had two children, Brandon Lee and Shannon Lee. Bruce Lee had opened his own kung fu school at the time and was teaching Jun Fan Gung Fu, Lee's modified version of Wing Chun, which would later serve as the basis for Jeet Kune Do. He died suddenly on July 20, 1973, of an allergic reaction to an analgesic.

Linda married Tom Bleecker in 1988, and they divorced in 1990. She later wed stockbroker Bruce Cadwell in 1991 and they lived in Rancho Mirage, California.

On March 31, 1993, her son Brandon was accidentally shot to death by a prop gun while filming The Crow.

Cadwell has continued to promote Bruce Lee's martial art Jeet Kune Do. She retired in 2001, and her daughter Shannon (who now heads the Lee family estate), together with son-in-law Ian Keasler, run the Bruce Lee Foundation, a nonprofit organization dedicated to teaching Bruce Lee's philosophy on martial arts and his writing on philosophy.

Books
Cadwell wrote the 1975 book Bruce Lee: The Man Only I Knew, on which the 1993 feature film Dragon: The Bruce Lee Story was based. She was portrayed by actress Lauren Holly in the film adaptation.  She also wrote the 1989 book The Bruce Lee Story.

References

External links
Bruce Lee Foundation website  

1945 births
Living people
American biographers
American women biographers
American people of English descent
American people of Swedish descent
Garfield High School (Seattle) alumni
20th-century American women writers
20th-century American non-fiction writers
People from Everett, Washington
Writers from Washington (state)
American people of Irish descent
University of Washington College of Education alumni
Family of Bruce Lee